Gertrude Schweitzer (1911–1989) was an American artist. Schweitzer was born in New York city and studied at the Pratt Institute. Her work is included in the collections of the Whitney Museum of American Art, the Brooklyn Museum, the Metropolitan Museum of Art and the Art Institute of Chicago.

References

1911 births
1989 deaths
American women painters
American watercolorists
Women watercolorists
20th-century American painters
20th-century American women artists
Pratt Institute alumni
Painters from New York City